Feed Me may refer to:
Jon Gooch (born 1984), English musician, stage name Feed Me
Feed Me (film), a 2013 Chinese drama

Songs
"Feed Me (Git It)", a song by Alan Menken and Howard Ashman from the 1982 musical Little Shop of Horrors
"Feed Me", a song by English band Wire from the 1987 album The Ideal Copy
"Feed Me", a song by Belgian band Triggerfinger from the 2010 album All This Dancin' Around